Itzhak Vissoker (born 18 September 1944) is an Israeli former international footballer who competed at the 1970 FIFA World Cup, as well as at the 1976 Summer Olympics.

Vissoker played in 40 official games for the Israeli national side. He also played club football for Hapoel Petah Tikva and Maccabi Netanya.

References

1944 births
Living people
Israeli footballers
Israel international footballers
1964 AFC Asian Cup players
1968 AFC Asian Cup players
1970 FIFA World Cup players
Hapoel Petah Tikva F.C. players
Maccabi Netanya F.C. players
Olympic footballers of Israel
Footballers at the 1976 Summer Olympics
Asian Games silver medalists for Israel
Asian Games medalists in football
Association football goalkeepers
Footballers at the 1974 Asian Games
Medalists at the 1974 Asian Games
Israeli Football Hall of Fame inductees
Israeli Footballer of the Year recipients